Thierry van Werveke (23 October 1958 – 12 January 2009) was a Luxembourgish actor. He appeared in over 60 films and television shows between 1988 and 2009. He starred in Hochzäitsnuecht, which was screened in the Un Certain Regard section at the 1992 Cannes Film Festival.

Life

His first film experiences were in 1982 in Andy Bausch's short film Stefan. After this, he appeared in all of Bausch's films, generally in the starring role. Soon, he came to other directors' attention: he appeared in films by Paul Kieffer (Schacko Klak), Marc Olinger (De falschen Hond) and Pol Cruchten (Hochzäitsnuecht). Abracadabra, by Harry Cleven, was his first film in French. In his role as the Belgian "Henk" in Knockin' on Heaven's Door, a great success in Germany, he became known to the German public.

He regularly appeared in German films, TV films and series. For his role in Offside he received the Adolf-Grimme-Preis in 2008. He also often acted in Luxembourgish theatre productions, often directed by Frank Hoffmann. As the singer of the groups Nazz Nazz, Taboola Rasa and Luxus he also had a loyal following.

The last film in which he had a starring role was inthierryview, filmed by Andy Bausch as a sort of retrospective portrait and homage in 2008, after it had become known that Van Werveke was very ill.

He died on 11 January 2009 at the age of 50.

Selected filmography

 Stefan (1982)
 Lupowitz (1982)
 ... der Däiwel (1984)
 Van Drosselstein (1984)
 Gwyncilla, Legend of Dark Ages (1986)
 Troublemaker (1988) - Jacques Guddebuer
 De falschen Hond (1989) - Le chef des 'Brésiliens'
  (1989) - Petz Zamponi
 Schacko Klak (1989) - Eck
 Heartbreakhotel (1990)
 Abracadabra (1992) - Naze
 Dead Flowers (1992) - Alex
 Hochzäitsnuecht (1992) - Christian
  (1993) - Jängi Jacoby
 Die Rebellion (1993, TV Movie) - Willi
 Wilde Jahre (1994) - Paul
 Hasenjagd (1994) - Berghammer
 I Promise (1994) - Ferri
 Life Is a Bluff (1996) - Pfeife
 Knockin' on Heaven's Door (1997) - Henk - der Belgier
 Back in Trouble (1997) - Johnny Chicago
 Caipiranha (1997) - Jürgen Grabowski
 The Polar Bear (1998) - Norbert
 Kai Rabe gegen die Vatikankiller (1998) - Aufnahmeleiter
 Die 3 Posträuber (1998) - Schräger Otto
 Eduard's Promise (1998)
  (2000) - Josef Mikesch
 Electric theatre (2000, Documentary)
 Nach der Zeit (2000)
 Ein göttlicher Job (2001) - Jonathan
 Auf Herz und Nieren (2001) - Glotze
 Elefantenherz (2001) - Kopella
 Wolfzeit (2003) - Jean
 Le Club des Chômeurs (2003) - Jerôme Klein dit Géronimo
 La Revanche (2004) - Jérôme Klein
 Elegant (2004, Short)
 Offside (2005) - Baba Can
 The last 50 hours of Frankie Blue (2006, Short)
 Bye Bye Blackbird (2006) - Man on Girder
 Deepfrozen (2006) - Lars
 Tabula rasa (2006, Short) - David
 Perl oder Pica (2006) - Mr. Pendelmeyer
 Freigesprochen (2007) - Hotelier
 Luftbusiness (2007)
 Tausend Ozeane (2008) - Ulrich Willer
 1½ Knights: In Search of the Ravishing Princess Herzelinde (2008) - Siegfried
 inthierryview (2008)
 Réfractaire (2009) - Edouard
 Der Fürsorger (2009) - Aschwanden
 Räuberinnen (2009) - Reisig
 Lingo vino'' (2009, Short) - Briefträger

References

External links

1971 births
2009 deaths
Luxembourgian male film actors
Deaths from cancer in Luxembourg
Actors from Geneva
Luxembourgian male television actors
20th-century Luxembourgian male actors
21st-century Luxembourgian male actors